Alessandro de Matos (born 26 September 1980) is a Brazilian boxer. He competed in the men's light welterweight event at the 2004 Summer Olympics.

Boxing career

Olympics
2004 - Represented Brazil in Boxing for the 2004 Athina Summer Games

Pro boxing career

References

External links
 

1980 births
Living people
Brazilian male boxers
Olympic boxers of Brazil
Boxers at the 2004 Summer Olympics
Place of birth missing (living people)
Light-welterweight boxers